Jelenin  is a village in the administrative district of Gmina Chojna, within Gryfino County, West Pomeranian Voivodeship, in north-western Poland, close to the German border.

For the history of the region, see History of Pomerania.

The village has a population of 70.

Notable people 
 Czesław Hoc (born 1954 in Jelenin) a Polish politician, elected to the Sejm in 2005

References

Jelenin